ICC may refer to:

Buildings
 International Commerce Centre, a skyscraper in Hong Kong
 International Commercial Center, a skyscraper in Ulaanbaatar, Mongolia
 International Convention Centre (disambiguation), any of several convention centers
 Internationales Congress Centrum Berlin, Germany
 Edward B. Bunn S.J. Intercultural Center, a building on the campus of Georgetown University, US
 International Convention Centre, Birmingham, a conference centre in Birmingham, England

Games
 Interstellar Confederation of Corporations, in the MMORPG Anarchy Online
 International Cricket Captain (series), a video game series about cricket management
 Internet Chess Club, a website for playing chess
 Icecrown Citadel, in the MMORPG World of Warcraft: Wrath of the Lich King

Judicial courts
 International Criminal Court, an intergovernmental organization and international tribunal headquartered in The Hague, the Netherlands
 Illinois Commerce Commission, a quasi-judicial tribunal which regulates public utility services in the U.S. state of Illinois

Organizations

Government
 Interstate Commerce Commission, a now-defunct U.S. government regulatory body
 International Control Commission, which oversaw the 1954 Geneva Accords ending the First Indochina War
 International Computing Centre, based in Geneva, Switzerland, established by the UN in 1971
 International Computation Centre, in Rome, Italy, created by UNESCO in 1951, now the Intergovernmental Bureau for Informatics
 International Certificate of Competence for Operators of Pleasure Craft, a European boating license
 Isthmian Canal Commission, a body set up to administer the Panama Canal Zone

Politics
 International Communist Current, a communist organization
 Inuit Circumpolar Council, a non-governmental organization representing several peoples in the far north
 International Coordinating Committee of National Human Rights Institutions
 Israel on Campus Coalition

Religion
 International Christian Concern, a human rights organization
 International Christian Church, a group of Stone-Campbell Restoration churches led by Kip McKean and split off from the ICOC
 International Churches of Christ, a group of Stone-Campbell Restoration Movement Christian churches
 International Critical Commentary, an academic level biblical commentary series
 Irish Council of Churches, an ecumenical Christian body

Sports
 International Cricket Council, the governing body of cricket
 International Champions Cup, friendly association football tournament of mostly European clubs
 International Co-ordination Committee of World Sports Organizations for the Disabled, 1982–1989 predecessor of the International Paralympic Committee
 Illinois College Conference, a defunct American collegiate athletic conference
 Indiana Collegiate Conference, a defunct American collegiate athletic conference

Business
 Industrial Credit Company, (later Industrial Credit Corporation) purchased by the Halifax
 Information Control Company, an information technology consulting firm headquartered in Columbus, Ohio
 Innovation Collaboration Centre, a startup incubator in Adelaide, South Australia
 Innovative Communications Corporation, a telecommunications company in the United States Virgin Islands
 International Chamber of Commerce, supporting global trade and globalisation
 International Code Council, US-based building codes organisation
 International Controls Corporation, an American holding company founded by Robert Vesco
 International Culinary Center, a cooking school with several locations

Other organizations
 Imperial Camel Corps, an historic British Commonwealth military unit
 Incarnation Children's Center, a New York orphanage, specializing in care of children with HIV/AIDS
 Indian Cinematograph Committee, an Indian government committee overseeing censorship and cinema
 Inter-Cooperative Council at the University of Michigan, a student housing cooperative in Ann Arbor, Michigan
 International Association for Cereal Science and Technology, formerly International Association for Cereal Chemistry
 International Camp on Communication and Computers, European organisation for blind and partially sighted students
 International Centre for Choreography, based at the Australian Dance Theatre in Adelaide, South Australia
 International Code Council, a US-based organization that publishes the International Building Code
 International Color Consortium, a standards body for computer color management
 Institute for Computational Cosmology, an academic research institute at Durham University
 NTT InterCommunication Center, a media art gallery in Tokyo, Japan

Science and technology
 ICC, the transistor collector current in an NPN bipolar junction transistor
 ICC profile, for characterising a color space or device
 Integrated circuit card identifier (ICCID), the identifier of SIM card
 Immunocytochemistry, interaction of chemicals with immune responses of cells
 Infinite conjugacy class property, or ICC group in mathematics
 Information Coding Classification, a system for classification of literature or other information by knowledge domains
 Intel C++ Compiler, a group of C and C++ compilers from Intel

 International calling code, a prefix to call to a phone number from abroad
 International consensus criteria, proposed diagnostic criteria for chronic fatigue syndrome (myalgic encephalomyelitis)
 Interstitial cell of Cajal, a type of interstitial cell found in the gastrointestinal tract
 Intraclass correlation or intraclass correlation coefficient
 Item characteristic curve, curves used in item response theory 
 Smart card, or integrated circuit card or integrated chip card

Schools

United Kingdom
 Icknield Community College, a comprehensive school in Watlington, Oxfordshire
 Ifield Community College, a school in Crawley, West Sussex
 International Christian College, Glasgow, Scotland
 Ivybridge Community College, a secondary school in Ivybridge, Devon

United States
 Illinois Central College, main campus in East Peoria; two campuses in Peoria, one in Pekin, Illinois
 Independence Community College, a community college in Independence, Kansas
 Isothermal Community College, a community college in Spindale, North Carolina
 Itasca Community College, a community college in Grand Rapids, Minnesota
 Itawamba Community College, campuses located in Fulton and Tupelo, Mississippi
 Izard County Consolidated High School, a high school and school district in Brockwell, Arkansas
 Dr. William M. Scholl College of Podiatric Medicine, formerly known as the Illinois College of Chiropody

Events
 International Cartographic Conference, an academic conference of the International Cartographic Association
 International Conference on Communications, an academic conference for engineers
 International Conference on Creationism, a conference in support of young earth creationism
 International Coastal Cleanup, a worldwide day of Trash CleanUp Activities founded by Ocean Conservancy staff member Linda Maraniss in 1986

Other uses
 Commerce Clause, also known as the Interstate Commerce Clause and Indian Commerce Clause, an enumerated power of the US Constitution
 Integration competency center, a shared service function within an organization for performing methodical data integration, system integration or enterprise application integration
 Maryland Route 200 or Intercounty Connector, a highway between the two Maryland suburban counties bordering Washington, DC, US
 International Certificate of Competence, a boating certificate
 Independent component city, a legal class of cities in the Philippines